Winter of Love is Japanese singer Kumi Koda's seventh compilation album, released under Rhythm Zone. It was issued in CD, CD+DVD/Blu-ray and CD+Fan Club DVD editions. The album features some of Kumi's top selling ballads, as well as two new songs. The track On And On was used as primary promotional song. The music video for On And On was the first music video strictly made for mobile phones. Kumi premiered the music video during a live broadcast on her official LINE account on 19 January 2016. It was released worldwide the following day. The full video kept the cellphone aesthetic, but was rendered to fit full screen.

Commercial performance
WINTER of LOVE debuted at #1 on the Oricon Daily Albums chart and entered the Oricon Weekly Albums chart #2. The album also debuted at #1 on the Recochoku Weekly Albums chart.

Track listing

Charts

References

External links
 Winter of Love – Kumi Koda's official website, powered by Rhythm Zone.

2016 compilation albums
Japanese-language albums
Rhythm Zone albums
Koda Kumi albums